The Mexican National Trios Championship (Campeonato National Trios in Spanish) is a Mexican professional wrestling three-man tag team championship created and sanctioned by "Comisión de Box y Lucha Libre Mexico D.F." (the Mexico City Boxing and Wrestling Commission in Spanish). Although the Commission sanctions the title, it does not promote the events in which the title is defended. As it is a professional wrestling championship, it is not won legitimately; it is instead won via a scripted ending to a match or awarded to a wrestler because of a storyline. All title matches take place under two out of three falls rules.

The Mexican National Trios Championship was created in 1985. Consejo Mundial de Lucha Libre (CMLL; Spanish for World Wrestling Council) was given the promotional control of the title while the Commission only have to approve the champions. The first champion crowned was the team of Los Infernales (Spanish for The Infernals; MS-1, Pirata Morgan and El Satánico). CMLL controlled the championship from 1985 until 1994, when Asistencia Asesoría y Administración (AAA; Spanish for Assistance Consultancy and Administration) took control of the championship. The first champion of the AAA-controlled era was Los Hermanos Dinamita (Spanish for The Dynamite Brothers; Cien Caras, Máscara Año 2000 and Universo 2000). When the AAA began to co-promote events with Promotora Mexicana de Lucha Libre (PROMELL), the title became jointly operated; when the AAA and PROMELL split up in 1996, the championship was vacated. The Commission returned the championship to CMLL, allowing them to hold a tournament to crown the new champions, the team of Blue Panther, Fuerza Guerrera and El Signo. Since 1996, the titles have been exclusively controlled by CMLL.

Atrapasueños (Dulce Gardenia, Espiritu Negro and Rey Cometa) are the current champions, after winning a four-way match for the vacant title on May 27, 2022. This is the team's first reign and they are the 42nd overall champions. Los Reyes de la Atlantida hold the record for most reigns as a team, with three. The team of Blue Panther, Fuerza Guerrera and El Signo held the title for the longest period, at 1,728 days, while Los Payasos have held it for the shortest period, at 26 days.

Title history

Combined reigns

By team
Championships without a specific start or end date are not included as it is not possible to calculate the specific number of dates for a reign.
Key

By wrestler

Footnotes

References

General

Specific

Consejo Mundial de Lucha Libre championships
Mexican national wrestling championships
Professional wrestling trios tag team champion lists